Rodney Linderman (born 21 May 1963), also known by his stage name Rodney Anonymous, is an American musician, journalist, and humorist currently based in Philadelphia.  He is best known as the lead vocalist, keyboardist and co-songwriter of the satirical punk rock band The Dead Milkmen.

Early life and education 
Linderman grew up in Wagontown, Pennsylvania. He attended Coatesville Area High School with future bandmate Joe Genaro.

In 1984, while Linderman was a sophomore at West Chester University, he and a classmate were prevented from entering a talent competition because the lyrics to the song they intended to sing - "Jesus Entering from the Rear" - were considered by administrators to be "gross" and "counterproductive to the goals of the competition."

Musical career

With the Dead Milkmen (1983–1995)

Linderman joined an embryonic version of Genaro's basement group the Dead Milkmen while in high school around 1981.  Briefly serving as drummer, Linderman had become the group's lead singer by the time of their first public performance in 1983.

Following the success of their 1985 debut LP, Big Lizard in My Backyard, the group toured extensively and enjoyed college radio and modest MTV-based success behind eight LPs.  Linderman served mainly as the group's lead vocalist until 1992's Soul Rotation album, where he acted primarily as keyboardist behind Genaro's vocals.  Later releases saw a balance of these two roles.  The group disbanded in 1995.

Later activity; Dead Milkmen reformation (1995–present)

Shortly before the Dead Milkmen disbanded, Linderman founded the group Burn Witch Burn with his wife Vienna and four other musicians.  The group blended American roots music with Celtic folk, Pogues-styled punk and gothic leanings.  They released a demo tape, one CD-EP and one full-length album before breaking up in 2001.

After two reunion shows in 2004, the Dead Milkmen officially reformed in 2008.  Linderman, Genaro and drummer Dean Sabatino were joined by bassist Dan Stevens who replaced the deceased former bassist of the group, Dave Schulthise.  They have since resumed performing regular concerts and working on new material.

Linderman also plays in the group 25 Cromwell Street with Bill Fergusson of Burn Witch Burn and guest appearances by members of the Dead Milkmen.

Journalism
Linderman keeps an active comedic/topical blog, Rodney Anonymous Tells You How to Live, as well as a radio show of the same name on Y-Not Radio. He regularly contributed to the Philadelphia City Paper, writing about music, as well as political, social and local issues.

References

External links
Rodney Anonymous Tells You How to Live
Official Dead Milkmen web page

Musicians from Philadelphia
American punk rock singers
Living people
American bloggers
The Dead Milkmen members
1963 births
West Chester University alumni